Steven Raymond Christian (born 26 June 1951, Pitcairn Island) is a politician, convicted sex offender and child rapist from the Pitcairn Islands. He was mayor of the islands from 1999 until 2004, when he was removed from office after being found guilty in the Pitcairn child sexual abuse trial.

Background and mayoralty
Christian is a patrilineal descendant of Fletcher Christian, leader of the mutineers in the late 18th century on HMS Bounty, a story told in the 1932 Nordoff and Hall novel Mutiny on the Bounty, and several subsequent motion picture versions. He is the son of Ivan Roa Christian and Verna Carlene "Dobrey" Young, a descendant of Ned Young. Ivan Roa Christian is the son of Richard Charles Edgar Christian and nephew of Charles Richard Parkin Christian, and is the grandson of Francis Hickson Christian. Steve Christian married Olive Jal Brown in 1972 and they have four children: Trent, Randy, Shawn and Tania.

Public respect for Steve Christian's lineage gave him considerable influence long before he held political office, first as a member of the Island Council in 1976. He again served on the Council in 1982, and was briefly Chairman of the Internal Committee (considered the second-most influential political position on the island) in 1985. He was to hold this position again in 1991 and 1992, 1994 and 1995, and 1998 and 1999, when he was elected as the island's first mayor. The title was new but the office was not: the mayor had previously been known as the magistrate.

Christian was the Mayor of the Pitcairn Islands, a British dependency in the Pacific Ocean, from 7 December 1999 to 30 October 2004. He also acted as the island's supervising engineer, dentist, radiographer, and as coxswain of the longboat, which is described as Pitcairn's umbilical cord to the outside world. He was formally dismissed from office on 30 October 2004, following his rape conviction on 24 October.

Sexual assault trial

In 2004, Steve Christian, along with six other men, was tried on charges of rape and child sexual abuse by the Pitcairn Supreme Court. Over the course of the trial, it was alleged that Christian repeatedly raped or assaulted a number of island women, including his children, over a period of several years – using the remoteness of the island and his position of power to coerce their silence. Christian denied all accusations of impropriety, but admitted having consensual sex with several of his children. Christian pleaded not guilty to all charges of rape and indecent assault, but on 24 October 2004, he was convicted of committing five rapes between 1964 and 1975 for which he was sentenced for three years. He was acquitted of a sixth rape charge and of four indecent assault charges. 

On 8 November 2004, Christian's sister Brenda, the island's sole police officer, was elected by the Island Council to succeed him in an interim capacity, pending elections scheduled for 15 December, when Jay Warren, the acquitted former magistrate, was elected mayor.

References

1951 births
Living people
People convicted of child sexual abuse
Members of the Island Council of the Pitcairn Islands
Pitcairn Islands people convicted of rape
Mayors of the Pitcairn Islands
Pitcairn Islands people of English descent
Pitcairn Islands people of Manx descent
Pitcairn Islands people of Saint Kitts and Nevis descent
Pitcairn Islands people of Polynesian descent
Pitcairn Islands people of American descent
Pitcairn Islands people of Scottish descent
Politicians convicted of sex offences
Prisoners and detainees of the United Kingdom
Pitcairn Islands Seventh-day Adventists
Incest
Heads of government who were later imprisoned